Massachusetts Computer Associates (originally just Computer Associates), also known as COMPASS, was a software company founded by Thomas Edward Cheatham Jr. and based in Wakefield, Massachusetts from approximately 1961 to 1991, focusing primarily on programming language design and implementation, especially source-to-source transformation. It was acquired in the late 1960s by Applied Data Research.

Many well-known computer scientist were employed by, or consulted for, COMPASS at some point in their careers, including Michael J. Fischer, Stephen Warshall, Robert W. Floyd, and Leslie Lamport. Some of the systems they worked on include AMBIT/G and IVTRAN, a Fortran compiler for the ILLIAC IV.

Leslie Lamport wrote his influential "Time, Clocks" paper while he was at COMPASS.

The original vectorizing compiler for the ILLIAC IV was written at COMPASS with contributions by Lamport, who worked there part-time.

Robert Floyd's Treesort algorithm was published while Floyd was at COMPASS.

Corporate history

Applied Data Research (ADR) bought Massachusetts Computer Associates in the late 1960s. ADR was sold to Ameritech in 1986 and then by Ameritech to the (unrelated) Computer Associates of New York.  Shortly after ADR was sold to Computer Associates, Compass was in turn sold to SofTech.

Notes

1961 establishments in Massachusetts
1987 disestablishments in Massachusetts
American companies established in 1961
American companies disestablished in 1987
Computer companies established in 1961
Computer companies disestablished in 1987
Defunct computer companies based in Massachusetts
Defunct software companies of the United States
Software companies established in 1961
Software companies disestablished in 1987